Wes Keller (born April 24, 1946) is a Republican member of the Alaska House of Representatives, representing the 14th District. He is currently serving as Co-Chair of the Health & Social Services Committee, Chair of the Administrative Regulation Review Committee, and is a member of the Community & Regional Affairs Committee, Education Committee, and the Fisheries Special Committee. He also serves on the Administration and Law Finance Subcommittees, for the 26th Legislature. Before elected to office Wes Keller was a building maintenance and construction contractor.  Keller is a member of the American Legislative Exchange Council (ALEC), serving as Alaska state leader.


Personal life
Representative Keller has a wife: Gayle, three children: Matt, April & Zach, and five grandchildren. Wes Keller graduated from Central High School, Superior, Wisconsin in 1964 and received a Bachelor of Science in Broad Field Science Major with minors in Math and Physics from the University of Wisconsin–Superior in 1986.

Girl Scouts 
In 2012, Representative Wes Keller blocked a resolution honoring the 100th anniversary of the Girl Scouts due to internet rumors that the Girl Scouts were linked to Planned Parenthood.  He stated "I'm sure you are aware of the information that's floating around the internet, and I'd like to give you the opportunity to respond to your connection, the Girl Scout connection, with Planned Parenthood and the activist role in that — is there a connection? Is there not? Frankly, I haven't looked into it but I see it's out there,"  Keller later softened his tone, praising the Girl Scouts but refusing to let the resolution pass.

Ties to ALEC 
Wes Keller is a current member of ALEC, serving as its state leader and has attended conferences in 2011 and 2014

References

External links
 Alaska State House Majority Site
 Alaska State Legislature Biography
 Project Vote Smart profile
 Wes Keller at 100 Years of Alaska's Legislature
 American Legislative Exchange Council

1946 births
21st-century American politicians
Living people
Republican Party members of the Alaska House of Representatives
Politicians from Minneapolis
People from Wasilla, Alaska
University of Wisconsin–Superior alumni